Saint Guthagon (or Guthagonius, Guthagonus) was a possibly Irish hermit who lived in Belgium, most likely in the 8th century, and became venerated as a saint.

Monks of Ramsgate account

The monks of St Augustine's Abbey, Ramsgate wrote in their Book of Saints (1921),

Baring-Gould's account

Sabine Baring-Gould (1834–1924) in his Lives Of The Saints wrote under July 3,

Butler's account

The hagiographer Alban Butler (1710–1773) wrote in his Lives of the Fathers, Martyrs, and Other Principal Saints under July 3,

O'Hanlon's account

John O'Hanlon (1821–1905) wrote of Guthagon in his Lives of the Irish Saints under July 3.
St. Guthagon, Confessor, in Belgium, probably in the Eighth Century.
He notes that the Belgian Flemings tended to call all strangers Scots, but it is generally accepted that Guthagon came from Scotia, which could mean Ireland or Scotland. 
He continues,

Notes

Citations

Sources

 
 
 
 

Medieval Irish saints on the Continent
8th-century deaths